The 2021 Missouri Valley Conference men's soccer tournament was the postseason men's soccer tournament for the Missouri Valley Conference held from November 9 through November 14, 2021. The First Round was held at campus sites. The semifinals and finals took place at Betty & Bobby Allison South Stadium in Springfield, Missouri. The six-team single-elimination tournament consisted of three rounds based on seeding from regular season conference play. The defending champions were the Missouri State Bears, who successfully defended their title by defeating Evansville 3–0 in the final.  The conference tournament title was the third for the Missouri State men's soccer program, and second for head coach Michael Seabolt.  As tournament champions, Missouri State earned the Missouri Valley's automatic berth into the 2021 NCAA Division I men's soccer tournament.

Seeding 
All six Missouri Valley Conference men's soccer programs qualified for the 2021 Tournament.  Teams were seeded based on their regular season records.  Tiebreakers were used to determine the seedings of teams who finished with identical conference records.  One tiebreaker was required to determine the fifth and sixth seeds as Drake and Bradley both finished the regular season with a record of 3–7–0.  Drake earned the 5th seed by virtue of defeating Bradley 2–1 both times the teams met during the regular season.

Bracket

Schedule

Opening Round

Semifinals

Final

Statistics

Goalscorers

All-Tournament team

Source:

MVP in bold

References 

2021